King's Highway 103, commonly referred to as Highway 103, was a provincially maintained highway in the Canadian province of Ontario. Located in the District Municipality of Muskoka and Simcoe County, the highway extended from Highway 12 at Waubaushene to Highway 69 at Foot's Bay. Established in 1944, it was originally a short gravel highway connecting Waubaushene to Port Severn. In 1950 it was chosen as the future route of the Trans-Canada Highway and extended to Foot's Bay. It existed until 1976, when a series of renumberings eliminated the designation, replacing it with Highway69; Highway 400 has since been built over the majority of the former route.

Route description 
Highway103 followed much of the route that Highway400 now takes between Highway12 at Coldwater and the former Highway69 junction (Exit 189) south of Mactier. From there it followed what is now the east-west section of Lake Joseph Road to Foot's Bay, where it ended what was Highway 69, later Highway 169, and is presently Muskoka District Road169 and the north-south section of Lake Joseph Road. Between Highway 400 and Foot's Bay, it is now designated as both Lake Joseph Road and Muskoka District Road 169.
Between Coldwater and Waubaushene, the route was concurrent with Highway12 for a brief period in the mid-1960s. From there, it crossed over Matchedash Bay and circled around the south and eastern shoreline of Sturgeon Bay to Port Severn. At Foot's Bay, it encountered Highway69, which continued east to Highway 11 in Gravenhurst and north to Parry Sound and Sudbury.

History 
Highway103 was first designated during  as a stub route of Highway12 from Waubaushene to Port Severn. The  highway was assumed on July19, 1944.
The original routing until the late 1950s followed what is now Pine Street, Coldwater Road and Duck Bay Road through Waubaushene. After crossing Matchedash Bay, the route turned onto Quarry Road, then turned north and followed what is now the northbound lanes of Highway400 straight into Port Severn. It turned west along Port Severn Road across the Trent–Severn Waterway and ended at Lone Pine Road. The entire route was gravel surfaced.
Beginning in 1956, Highway 501 continued west to Honey Harbour.

When Ontario signed the Trans-Canada Highway Agreement on April25, 1950, it had already chosen a Central Ontario routing via Waubaushene and Parry Sound;
Highway 17 through the Ottawa Valley was announced as a provincially-funded secondary route of the  the following day.
The route of Highway103 was chosen as a jump-off point to connect the two places. Tenders for building the approximately  extension from Port Severn to Highway69 at Foot's Bay were called on September25, 1953, and included bypasses of Waubaushene and Port Severn.
Construction was underway by the following year.
The new paved Highway103 was open by September 1958,
although the complex three-bridge Port Severn Bypass did not open until the following spring.
The old portions of the route through Waubaushene and Port Severn were transferred to Tay Township on January29, 1959.

In order to provide better route continuity for motorists travelling from Toronto to Sudbury, several highways were renumbered in the Muskoka area on May15, 1976. The section of Highway69 between Foot's Bay and its southern terminus of Highway12 at Brechin was redesignated as Highway 169, while the entirety of Highway103 was renumbered to form the new southern portion of Highway69.
The entirety of the former route (with the exception of the east-west section of Lake Joseph Road/Muskoka Road 169 west of Foot's Bay) has now been superseded by Highway400.

Major intersections

References

External links 

Approximate former route of Highway 103 on Google Maps. Note that this routing is not exact; in several locations, the highway followed roads which are now residential or local in nature and cannot be directly accessed from the current Highway 400 route.

103
Former segments of the Trans-Canada Highway